Rudra Kandali  (Assamese: ৰুদ্ৰ কন্দলি ) (B. 1200s) was a litterateur from Kamrup. He was a well known poet of the 12th century and contemporary of the likes of Haribara Vipra and Hema Saraswati.

He wrote short narrative poems based on the episodes of Mahabharata. He translated an episode of Drona Parva of Mahabharata relating to powers of Satyaki, son of Siva of Yadu race which (translation) is faithful, homely similes and metaphors are frequently used. Called Satyaki Prabesh, he did it under the patronage of Tamradhvaj, the successor of Dharmanarayan of Kamata kingdom fame.

See also
 Gopalacharana Dwija
 Bhusana Dvija

Notes

References

 

Kamrupi literary figures
Kamrupi poets
Indian male poets
13th-century Indian poets
1200 births
Year of death unknown